A list of 1. FC Union Berlin players, past and present.

Player list

Notes

External links
List of players

Players
 
Union Berlin
Association football player non-biographical articles